Sunshine is sunlight, the electromagnetic radiation emitted by the Sun, especially in the visible wavelengths.

Sunshine may also refer to:

People

Nickname 
 Ronnie "Sunshine" Bass (born 1955), American football player
 Sunshine Logroño (born 1951), Puerto Rican actor
 Sunshine Parker (1927–1999), American actor
 "Sunshine" Sonny Payne (1925–2018), American radio presenter
 Valerie French (wrestling) (born 1962), American professional wrestling valet, better known as Sunshine

Given name 
 Sunshine Anderson (born 1974), American singer
 Sunshine Cruz (born 1977), Filipina actress and singer
 Sunshine Dizon (born 1983), Filipina actress

Surname 
 Caroline Sunshine (born 1995), American actress
 Gary Sunshine, American playwright
 Louise Sunshine (born 1940), American real estate businesswoman
 Ken Sunshine (born 1948), American public relations consultant
 Marion Sunshine (1894–1963), American actress & songwriter
 Monty Sunshine (1928–2010), English clarinetist
 Souriya Sunshine (born 1946), Thai peace activist
 Tommie Sunshine (born 1971), American musician
 Tony Sunshine (born 1979), American singer

Places

Communities 
Australia
 Sunshine, New South Wales
 Sunshine, Victoria
 Sunshine North, Victoria
 Sunshine West, Victoria

United States
 Sunshine, Ashley County, Arkansas
 Sunshine, Garland County, Arkansas
 Sunshine, Colorado
 Sunshine, Greenup County, Kentucky
 Sunshine, Harlan County, Kentucky
 Sunshine, Louisiana

Elsewhere
 Sunshine, New Zealand
 Sunshine, Ontario, Canada

Bridges and roads 
 Sunshine Bridge, Louisiana, U.S.
 Sunshine Skyway Bridge, Tampa Bay, Florida, U.S.
 Sunshine Way, a street in Mitcham, Surrey, England

Buildings 
 Sunshine 60, a 60-story building in Tokyo
 Sunshine Building, a historic building in Albuquerque, New Mexico, U.S.

Other places 
 Sunshine Canyon, near Fourmile Canyon Creek in Colorado, U.S.
 Sunshine Mine in Idaho, U.S.
 Sunshine Motorway in Queensland, Australia
 Sunshine Peak in Colorado, U.S.
 Sunshine Village, a ski resort in Alberta, Canada
 Sunshine City (disambiguation)
 Sunshine Coast (disambiguation)
 Sunshine State (disambiguation)

Film and television 

 Sunshine (1948 film), a Swedish film directed by Gösta Werner
 Sunshine (1973 film), an American TV movie starring Cliff DeYoung
 Sunshine (1999 film), a historical film directed by István Szabó
 The Sunshine (2000 film), a documentary film by Phil Bertelsen
 Sunshine (2007 film), a science-fiction film directed by Danny Boyle

Television 
 Sunshine (American TV series), a 1975 comedy-drama based on the 1973 TV movie
 Sunshine (British TV series), a 2008 miniseries
 Sunshine (Australian TV series), a 2017 crime drama series
 Sunshine (Tugs character), a fictional "harbour switcher" from the TV series Tugs
 "Sunshine" (Tugs episode), the pilot episode of Tugs

Literature 
 Sunshine (novel), a 2003 vampire novel by Robin McKinley
 Sunshine (Kinnikuman), a fictional villain in the manga Kinnikuman
 Sunshine (magazine), a digest of uplifting short articles and anecdotes

Music

Performers 
 Sunshine (American band), a disco group with Donna Summer
 Sunshine (Serbian band), a rapcore/hip hop group
 Sunshyne, a British female pop group

Albums 
 Sunshine (Talk Normal album), 2012
 Sunshine (R.I.O. album), 2011
 Sunshine (Deric Ruttan album), 2010
 Sunshine (Jeff & Sheri Easter album), 2004
 Sunshine (S Club 7 album), 2001
 Sunshine (Dragon album), 1977
 Sunshine (The Emotions album), 1977
 Sunshine (The Archies album), 1970
 Sunshine, a 1993 EP by Miranda Sex Garden
 Sunshine (EP), a 2004 EP by Traci Lords
 Sunshine: Music from the Motion Picture, from the 2007 film
 Sunshine, by The Archies, 1970
 Sunshine, by Shawn Smith, 2011

Songs 

 "Sunshine" (The Archies song), 1970
 "Sunshine" (Jonathan Edwards song), 1971
 "Sunshine" (Dragon song), 1977
 "Sunshine" (Dino song), 1989
 "Sunshine" (Alice in Chains song), 1990
 "(Always Be My) Sunshine", by Jay-Z, 1997
 "Sunshine" (Gabrielle song), 1999
 "Sunshine" (Aerosmith song), 2001
 "Sunshine" (Gareth Gates song), 2003
 "Sunshine" (Lil' Flip song), 2004
 "Sunshine" (Twista song), 2004
 "Sunshine" (Alphrisk song), 2005
 "Sunshine" (Ricki-Lee Coulter song), 2005
 "Sunshine" (Rye Rye song), 2010
 "Sunshine" (David Guetta and Avicii song), 2011
 "Sunshine" (Tieks song), 2015
 "Sunshine" (Liam Payne song), by Liam Payne from Ron's Gone Wrong
 "Sunshine" (OneRepublic song), 2021
 "Sunshine", by The All-American Rejects from When the World Comes Down
 "Sunshine", by Atmosphere from Sad Clown Bad Summer 9
 "Sunshine", by The Beach Boys from Keepin' the Summer Alive
 "Sunshine", Bliss n Eso from Circus in the Sky
 "Sunshine", by Buckcherry from 15
 "Sunshine", by Chancellor and Verbal Jint
 "Sunshine", by CocoRosie from The Adventures of Ghosthorse and Stillborn
 "Sunshine", by Coko
 "Sunshine", by De La Soul from Stakes Is High
 "Sunshine", by Evermore from Dreams
 "Sunshine", by The First Edition from Ruby, Don't Take Your Love to Town
 "Sunshine", by 5ive from Invincible
 "Sunshine", by Handsome Boy Modeling School from So... How's Your Girl?
 "Sunshine", by Irving Berlin
 "Sunshine", by John Reuben from The Boy vs. the Cynic
 "Sunshine", by Juliana Hatfield from In Exile Deo
 "Sunshine", by Keane from Hopes and Fears
 "Sunshine", by Latto from 777
 "Sunshine", by Low from I Could Live in Hope
 "Sunshine", by Lupe Fiasco from Food & Liquor
 "Sunshine", by Matisyahu from Spark Seeker
 "Sunshine", by Matt Costa from Songs We Sing
 "Sunshine", by Misia from Mars & Roses
 "Sunshine", by Monni
 "Sunshine", by Naughty by Nature from Poverty's Paradise
 "Sunshine", by Nicki Minaj and Lil Wayne from Sucka Free, 2008
 "Sunshine", by The O'Jays from Back Stabbers
 "Sunshine", by Shirley Bassey
 "Sunshine", by Sia from Everyday Is Christmas
 "Sunshine", by Teddybears
 "Sunshine", by Traci Lords
 "Sunshine", by Tracy Bonham from The Liverpool Sessions
 "Sunshine (Everybody Needs a Little)", by Steve Azar, 2010
 "Sunshine (The Light)", by song by Fat Joe, 2021
 "Sunshine (Woke Me Up This Morning)", by Labelle from Pressure Cookin'
 "Sunshine on My Shoulders" or simply "Sunshine", a 1973 song by John Denver
 "The Sunshine", by Manchester Orchestra

Other 
 Sunshine pop, an American musical movement in the 1960s and 1970s that incorporated light rock
 Sunshine Records (United States)
 Sunshine Records (Australia)
 Sunshine FM, a New Zealand radio station
 Sunshine 855, an English radio station

Other uses 
 Sun Shine 36, a French sailboat design
 Sun Shine 38, a French sailboat design
 Sunshine Biscuits (Australia), a defunct Australian baker of biscuits
 Sunshine Biscuits (United States), an American baker of cookies, crackers, and cereals, now owned by Keebler
 Sunshine Harvester Works, an Australian engineering manufacturer
 Sunshine Holdings, a Sri Lankan conglomerate holding company
 Sunshine laws, freedom of information legislation
 Government in the Sunshine Act, a "sunshine law" passed in the United States in 1976
 Sunshine Policy, South Korea's doctrine towards North Korea, which emphasizes peaceful cooperation
 Sunshine unit, now known as a "strontium unit", used to measure the radioactivity of strontium-90 in the human body
 Super Mario Sunshine, a 2002 video game by Nintendo
 SS Sunshine, originally SS Hewsang, a steamship
 40th Infantry Division (United States) or "Sunshine Division"
 Project SUNSHINE, a series of research studies to ascertain the impact of radioactive fallout on the world's population
 Quantum-class cruise ship, a class of cruise ships from Royal Caribbean International, previously known by the code name Project Sunshine

See also 
 Sunlight (disambiguation)